Camille is a 1921 American silent drama film starring Alla Nazimova as Marguerite and Rudolph Valentino as her lover, Armand. It is based on the play adaptation La Dame aux Camélias (The Lady of the Camellias) by Alexandre Dumas, fils, which was first published in French as a novel in 1848 and as a play in 1852. Camille is one of numerous screen adaptations of Dumas, fils story. The film was set in 1920s Paris, whereas the original version took place in Paris in the 1840s. It had lavish Art Deco sets and Rudolph Valentino later married the film's art director, Natacha Rambova.

Plot
A young law student, Armand (Rudolph Valentino) becomes smitten with a courtesan, Marguerite (Alla Nazimova). Marguerite is constantly surrounded by suitors, whom she entertains at her lavish apartment.  She also has consumption and is frequently beset by bouts of illness.

Armand sees Marguerite at the opera and, later, pursues her when he attends one of her private parties.  She rejects his advances at first, but eventually returns his affection.

The two live happily together until Armand's father, seeking to protect his family's reputation, convinces Marguerite to end the relationship.  She finally relents and runs away to a wealthy client, leaving a note for Armand.

When Armand finds the note he is shattered. The sorrow eventually turns to rage, and he decides to plunge into Parisian nightlife, associating himself with Olympe, another courtesan.  When he sees Marguerite at a casino, he publicly denounces her.

Marguerite gives up her life as a courtesan and quickly finds herself in massive debt. Her illness also takes a heavy toll.  Eventually, as she lies dying in bed, her furniture and belongings are repossessed. She persuades the men taking her belongings to allow her to keep her most precious possession: a book - Manon Lescaut - Armand gave to her.

Marguerite dies lying in bed in her apartment holding the book Armand gave her,  wishing to sleep where she is happy dreaming about Armand. Marguerite's maid Nanine, and her newlywed friends Gaston and Nichette are at her bedside as she dies.  Unlike the original novel, the film does not depict Armand and Marguerite ever seeing each other again after the casino scene and offers no suggestion that Armand ever learned of Marguerite's sacrifice and true feelings for him.

Cast
 Rudolph Valentino as Armand Duval
 Alla Nazimova as Marguerite Gautier
 Rex Cherryman as Gaston Rieux
 Arthur Hoyt as Count de Varville
 Zeffie Tilbury as Prudence
 Patsy Ruth Miller as Nichette
 Elinor Oliver as Nanine, Marguerite's Maid
 William Orlamond as Monsieur Duval, Armand's Father
 Consuelo Flowerton as Olympe
 Edward Connelly as The Duke (uncredited)

Reception
Picture-Play Magazine wrote of the film in their August 1921 issue: "The Camille and Armand of tradition are forgotten in the potent lure of the modern characterization of Nazimova and Rudolph Valentino. Bizarre, ephemeral, at moments, and at others, frenzied, their version promises a haunting succession of mesmeric pictures. It does not aim to present the Camille that successive generations have applauded and sniffled over. Because it is Nazimova's presentation of a story that has survived even the buffetings of endless productions—good, bad, and indifferent—it promises to be interesting."

Preservation
The film has survived and has been made available to the public on DVD and VHS by various film distributors and independent dealers. It is presented as a bonus on the DVD copy of the 1936 version Camille with Greta Garbo.

References

External links

 
 
 
 
 Review from Motion Picture Classic magazine (December 1921)
 Kramer, Fritzi (2016), Camille (1921) A Silent Film Review at moviessilently.com (with stills)
 

1921 films
1921 romantic drama films
American romantic drama films
American silent feature films
American black-and-white films
Romantic period films
American films based on plays
Films set in Paris
Films based on Camille
Films based on adaptations
Articles containing video clips
Films directed by Ray C. Smallwood
Metro Pictures films
Surviving American silent films
1920s English-language films
1920s American films
Silent romantic drama films
Silent American drama films